The Vermont Catamounts women's ice hockey program represented the University of Vermont during the 2020–21 NCAA Division I women's ice hockey season.

Offseason

Recruiting

Departures

Regular season

Standings

Schedule
Source:

|-
!colspan=12 style=""| Regular Season
|-

|-
!colspan=12 style=""| Hockey East Tournament
|-

2020-21 Catamounts

Awards and honors
Olivia Kilberg, Hockey East Sportsmanship Award
Jessie McPherson, Hockey East Rookie of the Year
Jessie McPherson, Hockey East Pro Ambitions All-Rookie Team
Jessie McPherson, 2020-21 Hockey East Pro Ambitions All-Rookie Team
Maude Poulin-Labelle, Hockey East Second Team All-Star

References

Vermont Catamounts
Vermont Catamounts women's ice hockey seasons